Irish Theatre Magazine was an online cultural journal dedicated to in-depth coverage of theatre and the performing arts in Ireland. 

The print and web archives of Irish Theatre Magazine can be viewed at www.itmarchive.ie 

Founded in Dublin in 1998 by Karen Fricker and Willie White, from modest beginnings ITM established itself as a highly respected quarterly cultural print journal. Produced by a small team led by editor-in-chief (1998–2005) Karen Fricker, with managing editor Maura O'Keefe and art director Susan Conley, it was funded by the Arts Council of Ireland (An Chomhairle Ealaíon). 

From 2005, it was edited by Helen Meany, and continued to expand its news and feature coverage of all aspects of the performing arts, while upholding its commitment to review every new Irish professional theatre production. Its readership included theatre artists, professionals and keen audience members. 

In 2009, at the encouragement of the Arts Council, ITM moved exclusively online, with a new website launched in September 2009. 

In 2014, Irish Theatre Magazine ceased operations and created a comprehensive digital archive of the publication, to provide a resource for researchers, scholars and anyone interested in learning about key developments in an art form for which Ireland is internationally renowned. 

The print and web archives of Irish Theatre Magazine can be viewed at www.itmarchive.ie and the complete web archive can be accessed at www.itmarchive.ie/web

References

External links 
 Irish Theatre Magazine website
 Irish Theatre Magazine Facebook page
 Irish Theatre Magazine Twitter page

Theatre in Ireland